Greg Pearce is the name of:

 Greg Pearce (news presenter), Australian newsreader
 Greg Pearce (politician) (born 1955), Australian politician 
 Greg Pearce (footballer) (born 1980), English footballer

See also
Greg Pierce (1950–2016), Australian former rugby league footballer, and coach
Pearce (surname)